Priority level or priority, in the Telecommunications Service Priority system, is the level that may be assigned to an NS/EP telecommunications service, which level specifies the order in which provisioning or restoration of the service is to occur relative to other NS/EP or non-NS/EP telecommunication services. 

Priority levels authorized are designated (highest to lowest) "E," "1," "2," "3," "4," and "5" for provisioning and "1," "2," "3," "4," and "5" for restoration.

References

See also 
INMOS Transputer

United States communications regulation
Disaster preparedness in the United States